Steve Guillod (born 27 December 1968) is a retired Swiss football striker.

References

1968 births
Living people
Swiss men's footballers
FC Fribourg players
FC Wettingen players
Grasshopper Club Zürich players
FC Bulle players
Swiss Super League players
Association football forwards